Massey Ferguson F.C. are a football club based in Coventry, England. They joined the Midland Combination Division Two in 1993. For the 2011–12 season, they are members of the Coventry Alliance Football League Division Three.

History
Massey Ferguson F.C. was formed in 1956 as the works team for Coventry's Massey Ferguson factory and initially played in the Coventry Works League before becoming founder members of the Coventry Alliance, where they won at least one league title and a number of cups.

For the 1993–94 season the club joined the Midland Football Combination, initially in Division Two, where they were champions at the first attempt, and followed this up by winning the Division One title the following year.  They remained in the Premier Division until the end of the 2010–11 season, with a best finish of third in 1995–96.

At the end of the 2010–11 season they resigned from the Midland Combination and took the place of their reserves in the Coventry Alliance in Division Three.

Records
Best league performance: 3rd in Midland Combination Premier Division, 1995–96
Best FA Cup performance: never entered
Best FA Vase performance: never entered

References

External links

 

Association football clubs established in 1956
Football clubs in the West Midlands (county)
1956 establishments in England
Sport in Coventry
Football clubs in England
Coventry Alliance Football League
Midland Football Combination
Works association football teams in England